Alex Haynes (born February 13, 1982) is a former American football running back. He was signed by the Baltimore Ravens as an undrafted free agent in 2005. He played college football at UCF.

Haynes has also played for the Carolina Panthers, Denver Broncos and Florida Tuskers.

Early years
Haynes attended Maynard Evans High School in Orlando, Florida and went on to play for UCF from 2000-2004.

Professional career

First stint with the Ravens
Haynes was signed as an undrafted free agent by the Baltimore Ravens in 2005.

Carolina Panthers
After playing in NFL Europe in 2006, Haynes was signed by the Carolina Panthers.  He was released on September 2 and was signed to the practice squad on September 3. He was re-signed by the Panthers for the 2007 season, but was waived on September 7. He was later re-signed to the practice squad. The Panthers signed him from the practice squad on October 6. The Panthers tendered Haynes as an exclusive rights free agent and he was re-signed on February 26, 2008, to a one-year, $370,000 contract. He was released in late July.

Second stint with the Ravens
On August 1, 2008, Haynes signed with the Ravens. He was waived August 30.

Denver Broncos
On November 10, 2008, Haynes was signed by the Denver Broncos. He was released on November 22 and re-signed on December 22. He was later released again on February 11, 2009.

Florida Tuskers
Haynes was signed by the Florida Tuskers of the United Football League on September 9, 2009.

References

External links
 UCF Knights bio

1982 births
Living people
Players of American football from Orlando, Florida
American football running backs
UCF Knights football players
Baltimore Ravens players
Carolina Panthers players
Cologne Centurions (NFL Europe) players
Denver Broncos players
Florida Tuskers players